The Florida Forensic League, Inc., or FFL, is a speech and debate organization offered to all schools in the state of Florida. It is the governing body for local and state speech and debate competitions in Florida, with higher-level competition under the auspices of the National Forensic League and the National Catholic Forensic League. The league was officially incorporated by the State of Florida on November 20, 2003, and began operations on January 1, 2004, although it existed some time before then in an unorganized fashion. Competitors in the league have been extremely successful at national tournaments.

Officers

The officers of the Florida Forensic League are:

 President - Carol Cecil
 Vice President/Operations - Dario Camara
 Vice President/Webmaster - Paul Gaba
 Treasurer - Jennifer Sandman
 Secretary - Luis Dulzaides
 Panhandle Region Director - Charlie Williams
 Timacuan Region Director - Beth Eskin
 Gulf Coast Region Director - Dr. Terri St. John
 Macaw Region Director - Eric Jeraci
 Art Deco Region Director - Patricia Lewis
 Hurricane Region Director - Jennifer Kwasman

Events Sponsored

The Florida Forensic League offers the following events:

 Policy Debate
 Lincoln-Douglas Debate
 Public Forum Debate
 Oral Interpretation
 Duo Interpretation
 Dramatic Interpretation
 Humorous Interpretation
 Student Congress
 Original Oratory
 International Extemporaneous
 Domestic Extemporaneous
 World Schools Debate

The Florida Forensic League also offers Group Interpretation at the regional qualifying tournaments and the Varsity State Championship. Declamation is also offered at the Novice State Championship.

Districts

The Florida Forensic League divides the state of Florida into six regions:

 Panhandle - includes the counties of Escambia, Santa Rosa, Okaloosa, Walton, Holmes, Washington, Bay, Jackson, Calhoun, Gulf, Gadsden, Liberty, Franklin, Leon, Wakulla, Jefferson, Madison, Taylor, Lafayette, Hamilton, Suwannee, Columbia, Baker, Union, Bradford, Nassau, Duval, Clay, and St. Johns.
 Timacuan - includes the counties of Alachua, Putnam, Flagler, Marion, Volusia, Seminole, Lake, Orange, Brevard, Polk, and Osceola.
 Gulf Coast - includes the counties of Dixie, Gilchrist, Levy, Citrus, Hernando, Pasco, Pinellas, Hillsborough, Manatee, Sarasota, Hardee, DeSoto, Charlotte, and Lee.
 Macaw - includes the counties of Indian River, Okeechobee, Highlands, St. Lucie, Martin, Glades, Hendry, and Palm Beach.
 Art Deco - includes the counties of Monroe and Dade.
 Hurricane - includes the counties of Collier and Broward.

Qualifying

To compete at the Varsity State Championship, competitors must place in the qualifying range for their district. The number of qualifiers per event is determined in proportion to the membership of each region.

To compete at the Novice State Championship, competitors must:

 Be in grades 6–12.
 Have fewer than 25 NFL Points at the start of the current school year.
 Have competed in less than three tournaments during the previous school year.
 Have never competed in the Novice State Championship before.

Championship tournaments

The Florida Forensic League offers two state championships every year: a Varsity State Championship, which is open to all competitors who qualify; and a Novice State Championship, which is open only to novices.

The 2019–2020 Varsity State Championship was held February 29 and March 1 at Olympia High School in Orlando. The 2019–2020 Novice State Championship was scheduled to be held April 4 and April 5 at Cypress Bay High School in Florida but was cancelled due to concerns over the coronavirus outbreak.

References

External links
 Florida Forensic League, Inc. Website

Student debating societies
Organizations based in Florida